Eligio Pichardo (1929–1984) was a painter from the Dominican Republic. He worked in Santo Domingo and New York City, producing Expressionist and Abstract Expressionist works.

Early life and education
Pichardo was born in Salcedo, Hermanas Mirabal Province, and raised in San Francisco de Macorís, Duarte Province.

He enrolled in the National School of Fine Arts in Santo Domingo in 1945, studying under José Vela Zanetti and alongside Clara Ledesma and Gilberto Hernández Ortega. His early work was greatly influenced by Dominican artists Vela Zanetti, Jaime Colson and Darío Suro.

Career

In the early 1950s, Pichardo painted hundreds of murals in schools throughout Santo Domingo. Themes included the history of the Dominican Republic and Don Quixote.

He participated in important biennial art exhibitions held throughout the world, including São Paulo, Madrid and Paris. In 1951, he won a prize at the Madrid Biennial. Three years later he received a scholarship from the Instituto de Cultura Hispánica to study in Madrid. During his time in Europe, he was influenced by the work of Pablo Picasso and Jean Dubuffet.

After returning to Santo Domingo, he became a professor at the National School of Fine Arts. He had several solo exhibitions and participated in biennial art shows. He won the Santo Domingo Biennial in 1958 with his painting El Sacrificio del Chivo (Sacrifice of the Goat).

In 1961, after signing with "The Contemporaries" gallery in Manhattan, Pichardo moved to New York City. He had his first solo exhibition in the city in 1962. Later, his work was exhibited in the Sarduy Gallery.

The artist continued to live and work in New York City until 1978, when he returned to Santo Domingo.

Death
Pichardo died at age 54–55.

See also

 List of American artists 1900 and after
 List of Dominican painters
 List of Latin American painters
 List of people from New York City

References

De los Santos, Danilo, Memoria de la pintura dominicana, Volumen 3, Santo Domingo: Grupo León Jimenes, 2003.
De los Santos, Danilo, Memoria de la pintura dominicana, Volumen 4, Santo Domingo: Grupo León Jimenes, 2003.
Sullivan, Edward J., Arte latinoamericano del siglo XX, Editorial NEREA, 1996.

Date of birth missing
Date of death missing
Place of death missing
1929 births
1984 deaths
20th-century American painters
American male painters
Academic staff of the National School of Fine Art
Abstract expressionist artists
American Expressionist painters
American muralists
American art educators
Artists from Madrid
Dominican Republic emigrants to the United States
Dominican Republic expatriates in Spain
Dominican Republic painters
Hermanas Mirabal Province
Painters from New York City
People from San Francisco de Macorís
People from Santo Domingo
20th-century American male artists